Penguin is a 2007 award-winning children's picture book by Polly Dunbar. It is about a boy who receives a penguin as a present and how they interact.

Reception
Penguin has been favourably reviewed, with Kirkus Reviews writing: "Visually, Ben’s contortions and Lion’s aplomb hearken back to early Sendak. While it’s at first unclear whether the immutable Penguin is a stuffed toy, a pet or something else entirely, kids will know—by story’s end at the very latest—that this bird’s a friend. An attractively designed, child-appealing package.". Publishers Weekly found Dunbar’s "winsome mixed media illustrations carry the day in a story that pulls a few punches on readers", while Common Sense Media described it as a "charming, whimsical boy-meets-bird tale."

Penguin has been translated into many different languages. It has stood the test of time, with Walker Books publishing a 10th anniversary edition in 2017.

Awards
Penguin won the Nestlé Children's Book Prize Silver Award, the Red House Children's Book Award for Younger Children and a Booktrust Early Years Award. It was also shortlisted for the Kate Greenaway Medal, and was selected by The Sunday Times as one of the best books of 2007 for children 0 to 3 year olds.

Adaption
Penguin has been adapted for the stage, has played at the Edinburgh Fringe Festival and received positive reviews.

References

2007 children's books
Children's fiction books
Books about penguins
British picture books
British children's books
Walker Books books